Nexyz. Corporation is a Japanese publicly traded holding company in Tokyo, Japan. It controls a group of online media, sales, and other companies.

Company history
Nexyz. Corporation was founded as Japan Electric Communications (Nihon Denki Tsushin 日本電機通信) in May 1987 in Osaka, Japan by Takami Kondo, a 19-year-old entrepreneur. After changing its corporate name to Nexyz. Corporation in December 2000, the company conducted an initial public offering in March 2002 on the Nasdaq Japan market (Osaka Stock Exchange), and later on the First Section of the Tokyo Stock Exchange and First Section of the Osaka Stock Exchange in November and December 2004. At the time of the IPO, Kondo was the youngest executive to lead a publiclytraded company in Japan.

The Nexyz. Group has three business divisions: broadband business, solutions services, and cultural education.

References

Digital media
Online companies of Japan